Marie Radauer-Plank (born 1986) is an Austrian violinist.

Life and career 
Radauer-Plank was born in Salzburg, Austria, and began playing the violin at the age of three. Just seven years later she was a junior student at the Mozarteum University Salzburg. After her Matura, she took up studies in Hanover and Brussels, graduating in 2013 with the Konzertexamen. She studied with Lukas Hagen, Benjamin Schmid, Ulf Schneider and Augustin Dumay and with Reinhard Goebel in addition to baroque violin.

Concert activity 
While still a student, Radauer-Plank founded the Duo Brüggen-Plank together with the pianist Henrike Brüggen. The two musicians give numerous concerts at home and abroad. In 2017, the duo released the album Szymanowski: Works for Violin and Piano For the following album Enescu: Works for Violin and Piano (2019) the duo received a Supersonic Award in 2020 it was also nominated for an Opus Klassik and an International Classical Music Awards nominated. Another CD is planned for 2020, featuring works by Jan Václav Voříšek, Archduke Rudolf of Austria and Ludwig van Beethoven.

In addition to her chamber music concert activities, Radauer-Plank is also active as a soloist. Radauer-Plank has also performed in various baroque ensembles, including the Ensemble Diderot and the Ensemble Concerto Melante.

Radauer-Plank has won prizes at various international competitions. Radauer-Plank plays on a Dom Amati from 1746.

Recordings 
 Szymanowski: Works for Violin & Piano (2017). Duo Brüggen-Plank. Issued by Genuin.
 Enescu: Works for Violin & Piano (2019). Duo Brüggen-Plank. Issued by Genuin.

References

External links 
 
 

Austrian classical violinists
Women classical violinists
1986 births
Living people
Musicians from Salzburg